The East Brimfield Dam is located on the Quinebaug River in Sturbridge, Massachusetts, approximately  southwest of Worcester, Massachusetts.

Designed and constructed by the United States Army Corps of Engineers, this dam substantially reduces flooding along the Quinebaug and Thames rivers. Construction of the project began in 1958 with completion in 1960 at a cost of $6,580,000.

The East Brimfield Reservoir, located in Sturbridge and Brimfield to its west, lies within the Quinebaug River Watershed and is part of the Thames River Basin. Access to the site is available from US Route 20.

Description
Cut in rock, the spillway comprises a concrete weir  in length. The weir's crest elevation is 19.2 feet (7.0 m) lower than the top of the dam. Also located on the project are numerous natural bodies of water that are not affected by the dam under normal conditions, but are raised and inundated when the reservoir is filled for flood control. These include the  Lake Siog, and the  Lost Lake.

Recreation
There are many areas and facilities for recreation at the East Brimfield Lake project.

Day Use Recreation Areas
Lake Siog Recreation Area is located at the southern end of the project on Dug Hill Road in the town of Holland. It offers a shaded picnic area, freshwater swimming beach, and 3/4 mile nature trail. This recreation area is open seasonally (1st weekend in June - Labor Day) on Fridays, Saturdays, and Sundays from 10am-6pm.  There is no entrance fee.

East Brimfield Damsite is located on Riverview Avenue in the town of Sturbridge. Here, visitors can walk along the top of the dam, or walk the 3/4 mile self-guided nature trail. Open year-round, sunrise to sunset. No entrance fee.

Quinebaug River Canoe trail is a  flatwater canoe route along the Quinebaug River from the outlet of Lake Siog to East Brimfield Reservoir. The upstream-end canoe launching point is on Pond Bridge Road in the town of Holland. The downstream-end launching point is at the East Brimfield Reservoir boat ramp on US Route 20 in the town of Brimfield. Three "rest stops" are located along the way with benches for a quick rest. Overnight camping is prohibited. This is a designated National Recreational Trail and Watchable wildlife Area. No fee for use.

Champeaux Road Fishing Area is a handicapped accessible fishing area near the northern end of the reservoir, along Champeaux Road in the town of Sturbridge. Facilities include a parking area, and two accessible fishing platforms on the shoreline of Long Pond. No fee for use.

Boat Ramps
Long Pond Boat Ramp is located on the north side of US Route 20 in the town of Sturbridge. Paved area with portable toilet and information kiosk. Open in winter for ice fishing access. No fee.

Reservoir Boat Ramp is located on the south side of US Route 20 in the town of Brimfield. Paved area with information kiosk. Closed in winter. No fee.

Holland Pond Boat Launch is located on Pond Bridge Road in the town of Holland. Unpaved area with information kiosk. Recommended for car-top launching only. No fee.

References 

  Basic information website.

Dams in Massachusetts
Buildings and structures in Sturbridge, Massachusetts
United States Army Corps of Engineers dams
Dams completed in 1960